Harmost ("joiner" or "adaptor") was a Spartan term for a military governor. The Spartan general Lysander instituted several harmosts during the period of Spartan hegemony after the end of the Peloponnesian War in 404 BC.  They were sent into their subject or conquered towns, partly to keep them in submission, and partly to abolish the democratic form of government, and establish oligarchies instead.

Although in many cases they were ostensibly sent for the purpose of abolishing the tyrannical government of a town and restoring freedom, they were accused of acting like kings or tyrants themselves, such that the first century AD grammarian Dionysius thought that harmost was merely another word for "king".

In the peace of Antalcidas the Lacedaemonians pledged to reestablish free governments in their subject towns, but they nevertheless continued to install harmosts in them. Even Xenophon, generally pro-Spartan, censured the Spartans for the manner in which they allowed their harmosts to govern.

It is uncertain how long the office of an harmost lasted; but considering that a governor of the same kind, who was appointed by the Lacedaemonians in Cythera, with the title of Cytherodikes, held his office only for one year, it is not improbable that the office of harmost was of the same duration.

The Thebans also used the term during the Theban hegemony.

There is an earlier use of the word in a scholium to Pindar's odes, but the meaning isn't explained. It's been proposed these were officials sent as overseers into the Perioci communities.

See also
Episcopi
Epistates
Phrourarch
Dictionary of Greek and Roman Antiquities

References

Military ranks of Sparta
Ancient Greek government